USS M. M. Davis (SP-314) was a United States Navy minesweeper in commission from 1917 to 1919.

M. M. Davis was built as a commercial motorboat in 1912 by Jackson and Sharp Company at Wilmington, Delaware. The U.S. Navy purchased her from the C. E. Davis Packing Company on 7 April 1917 for World War I use.

Assigned to the 5th Naval District, M. M. Davis operated as a minesweeper for the rest of World War I.

M. M. Davis was stricken from the Navy List on 1 May 1919 and sold back to C. E. Davis Packing on 1 July 1919. She operated commercially until 1934.

References

NavSource Online: Section Patrol Craft Photo Archive M. M. Davis (SP 314)

Minesweepers of the United States Navy
World War I minesweepers of the United States
Ships built in Wilmington, Delaware
1912 ships